David E. Loper is an American geologist, having been Distinguished Research Professor (1991-1992) and the George W. DeVore Professor of Geological Science at Florida State University (1999).

References

Year of birth missing (living people)
Living people
Florida State University faculty
American geologists